is a Japanese manga artist. He is best known for his martial arts series Grappler Baki (1991–1999) and its four sequels, which have sold over 75 million volumes. In 1996, he began working on Garōden, an original work by Baku Yumemakura. He has also collaborated on the series Garōden Boy.

Prior to becoming a manga artist, he served five years in the 1st Airborne Brigade of the Japan Ground Self-Defense Force. During his service he practiced amateur boxing, and has competed in the National Sports Festival. He also holds a degree in Shorinji Kempo, which he has practiced since he was a teenager.

He is the father of Paru Itagaki, Beastars manga author.

Works
 Make-Upper
 
 
 
 
 
 , adaptation of the novel series
 , side story of the novel series
 , Bruce Irvin's extra costume design

References

External links
 

1957 births
Living people
Manga artists from Hokkaido
People from Kushiro, Hokkaido
Japan Ground Self-Defense Force personnel
Baki